Natthaya Thanaronnawat (born 12 June 1979) is a Thai long-distance runner. She won the marathon at the 2015 Southeast Asian Games and placed 130th at the 2016 Rio Olympics. She is married and has a daughter Willow.

References

1979 births
Living people
Natthaya Thanaronnawat
Natthaya Thanaronnawat
Athletes (track and field) at the 2016 Summer Olympics
Natthaya Thanaronnawat
Southeast Asian Games medalists in athletics
Natthaya Thanaronnawat
Competitors at the 2015 Southeast Asian Games
Natthaya Thanaronnawat
Natthaya Thanaronnawat